Vyšný Medzev is a village and municipality of Košice-okolie District in the Košice Region of eastern Slovakia. It is one of several towns in Bodva Valley. Other towns in Bodva Valley include: Jasov, Lucia Bania, Medzev (Metzenseifen), and Stos.

History

Origins

The Settlers
Until 1427, there was a mere mention of a town in the Jasov monastery's documents (Kauer, J. et al. 1986). It is no wonder then, that the  Premonstratensian Order—the "white" fathers—assumed religious control of this area. They favored the "Obere Ort" most likely due to the good relationship between the monastery in Jasov and its near proximity to the Lucia Mountain Mine.

Official Recognition
The contract, related to the mentioned town in 1427, was signed by the abbot of the monastery in Jasov on October 21, 1430. The vicar Johann from Vyšný Medzev, the judge Michael Swrger (later Schürger), the sworn in Hannus Nykel, Closperges and Cristan Lewberth and other invited townsmen were present at the signing.

Geography
The village lies at an altitude of 383 metres and covers an area of 32.345 km².
It has a population of 533 people.

External links
 http://www.oldmetzenseifen.de (Historical and genealogical website)

Notes

References 
Kauer, J., Schürger, J. and Wagner, K. (1986). "Unter- und Ober-Metzenseifen Stoß Unterzips—Ostslowakei," Hilfsbund Karpatendeutscher Katholiken e.V., Arbeitskreis Bodwatal.

Villages and municipalities in Košice-okolie District